Avshalom Pollak (born October 5, 1970) is an Israeli actor, director, choreographer and dance company artistic director.

Early life and education
Avshalom was born in Haifa, Israel. He was trained as a classical actor and graduated from the Nissan Nativ Drama School in Tel Aviv. After graduating, Avshalom was playing in a large number of films and television programs, as well as many theatrical plays. Among his leading roles were William Shakespeare's Romeo and Juliet as Romeo; Casssio in Othello; Molière's Valere in The Miser; Chekhov's Tuzenbach in Three Sisters and more. He had the opportunity to work at the Habimah Theatre, the Cameri Theater, Gesher Theater and the Haifa Municipal Theatre.

Since 1994, Avshalom Pollak has been working with Inbal Pinto, with whom he founded the Inbal Pinto and Avshalom Pollak Dance Company.

In 2011 Pinto and Pollak were given Israel's ministry of culture award for creation of Toros and Rushes Plus. In 2003 they directed, choreographed and designed the opera Armide by Christoph Willibald Gluck. In 2013 they directed, choreographed and designed the original musical The Cat That Lived A Million Times by Yoko Sano in Tokyo, and the opera The Cunning Little Vixen by Leoš Janáček in Bergen, Norway.

Together, Inbal Pinto and Avshalom Pollak have created, choreographed and designed the following works for their company: Oyster a co-production with The Maison De La Danse, Lyon, France (1999), Oyster won the award of The Israel Theater Academy Award for the year 2000 as The Best Production in Stage Arts category. BOOBIES a co-production with DeSingel Theater, Antwerp, Belgium (2002). Shaker (2006). Armide an opera by Christoph Willbald Gluck at  the Opera House of Wiesbaden in Germany (2004) and The Israeli Opera (2007). RUSHES A collaboration with Pilobolus Dance Theatre (2007). Hydra a co-production with Saitama Arts Foundation, Israel Festival (2008) and Stepts #11 (2008). Trout a co-production with Stavanger2008, Cultural Capital of Europe, Collaboration with the Kitchen Orchestra (2008). Bombyx Mori (2011). GOLDFISH (2013). The cunning little vixen, an opera by Leoš Janáček at the Bergen National Opera, Norway (2013)  Dust (2013). Wallflower a collaboration with Tel Aviv Museum of Art (2014). Wrapped Renewed Production. Originally created in 1998 (2015). Since 2008 he is the artistic director of Avshalom Pollak Dance Theatre.

In 2021 Avshalom collaborated with musician Umitaro Abe, created twelve short video-dance pieces titled "Liquid Season", all taking place in watery environments, each dedicated to a different month of the year. Water, as a field of emotions, is a platform for the creation of a world, from which we are made, and in which we create and change. The cycle of works embodies water as the element of nature and life, which makes for constant transformation. Concurrently, the cycle pays homage to the Duke of Berry’s Book of Hours (The Très Riches Heures)—an illuminated Christian prayer book also serving an almanac, commissioned by Jean, Duc de Berry, in the early 15th century from the Limbourg brothers. The manuscript’s illuminations portray scenes from the life of lords and peasants, against nature’s changes throughout the year. "liquid Season" is presented at the Petach Tikva Museum of Art’s.

In 2021 Avshalom Played the leading role "Y" in Nadav Lapid's film Ahed's Knee. The film was selected to compete for the Palme d'Or at the 2021 Cannes Film Festival. At Cannes, the film shared the Jury Prize with Memoria by Apichatpong Weerasethakul.

Selected work

 A chance for a 100 1994
 Wrapped 1998
 Oyster  1999
 Boobies 2002
 What Good Would the moon be 2004
 Armide 2003
 Shaker 2006
 Armide 2006
 Rushes 2007
 Hydra 2007
 Trout 2008
 Toros 2010
 Bombyx mori 2011
 Goldfish 2012
 The cunning little vixen 2013
 The cat that lived a million times 2013
 Dust 2013
 Wallflower 2014
 Wrapped 2015
 Slug 2016
 Icetree 2017
 Rashomon 2018
 Krump 2019
 Antu 2020
 Liquid season 2021
 Space Invaders 2021
 Moby D 2022

Awards
2000 Israeli Theater Academy award for "Oyster"
2007 The Israeli Ministry of Education and Culture award for creation
2011 The Israeli Ministry of Education and Culture awards for Artistic achievements and performance
2014 The Israeli Dance Critics Circle award "Best Dance Show" for "Wallflower"

References

External links
Avshalom Pollak Dance Theatre website
Avshalom Pollak Dance Theatre's Vimeo
Israeli Opera Web Site
Israeli Dance Web Site
Suzanne Dellal Dance Center Web Site
Jewish Theatre on Oyster
JPOST Reviewing "Wallflower"

Bergen National Opera

1970 births
Living people
Israeli male stage actors
Israeli choreographers
Israeli theatre directors
Male actors from Haifa